Fletcher Leon Smith (born October 13, 1943) is a former American football safety in the American Football League (AFL) and National Football League (NFL). He was drafted by the Kansas City Chiefs in the sixth round of the 1966 AFL Draft. He played college football at Tennessee State.  Smith also played for the Cincinnati Bengals and the Jacksonville Express of the World Football League (WFL).

References

1943 births
Living people
American football placekickers
American football punters
American football safeties
Cincinnati Bengals players
Kansas City Chiefs players
Tennessee State Tigers football players
American Football League players
People from Hearne, Texas
Players of American football from Texas